The Concurso Internacional de Guitarra Alhambra (English: Alhambra International Guitar Competition) is a biannual competition for classical guitarists which takes place at the Palau de la Música in Valencia, Spain.

Established in 1990 by Manufacturas Alhambra S.L. of Muro de Alcoy, Alicante, Spain, a well-known manufacturer of Spanish guitars, in order to mark their 25th anniversary, the event has since become one of the most prestigious awards for young guitarists. Participation is restricted to those of 35 years or younger, and previous first prize winners may not re-enter the competition in later years. There is a substantial monetary prize, with lesser amounts for the other finalists. In recent years the Concurso Alhambra has additionally awarded a Public's Prize as well as special prizes aimed at the promotion of Spanish composition for the guitar. The audience is open to members of the public.

List of Previous Winners

References

External links
 Official site

Music competitions in Spain
Classical guitar
Guitar competitions